In mathematics, in the field of group theory, a subgroup of a group is said to have the Congruence Extension Property or to be a CEP subgroup if every congruence on the subgroup lifts to a congruence of the whole group. Equivalently, every normal subgroup of the subgroup arises as the intersection with the subgroup of a normal subgroup of the whole group.

The following facts are known about CEP subgroups:

 Every retract has the CEP.
 Every transitively normal subgroup has the CEP.

References
.
.

Subgroup properties